Gilbert Dresch (born 14 September 1954) is a Luxembourgian former footballer and manager. A defender, he played his entire club career for Avenir Beggen and played 63 times for the Luxembourg national football team.

Career 

Dresch won three Luxembourg National Division titles and three Luxembourg Cups while playing for 
Avenir Beggen. He later managed Avenir Beggen for one season.

International goals 

 Scores and results list Luxembourg's goal tally first, score column indicates score after each Dresch goal.

Honours
Luxembourg National Division: 3
 1981–82, 1983–84, 1985–86

Luxembourg Cup: 3
 1982–83, 1983–84, 1986–87

References

1954 births
Living people
Luxembourgian footballers
Luxembourg international footballers
Luxembourgian football managers
Association football defenders
FC Avenir Beggen players
FC Avenir Beggen managers